The 1911–12 Yorkshire Cup was the seventh occasion on which the Yorkshire Cup competition, a Rugby league tournament, was held. This year saw a previous winner, Huddersfield, win the trophy by beating Hull Kingston Rovers by the score of 22-10

The match was played at Belle Vue, in the City of Wakefield, now in West Yorkshire. The attendance was 20,000 and receipts were £700. This was Huddersfield's third appearance in what would be seven appearances in eight consecutive finals between 1909 and 1919 (which included four successive victories and six in total.)

Background 

This season there were no junior/amateur clubs taking part, but last year's new entrant Coventry left to join the Lancashire Cup, reducing the number of entries by one to a total of thirteen. This in turn resulted in three byes in the first round.

Competition and Results

Round 1 
Involved 5 matches (with three byes) and 13 clubs

Round 2 – quarterfinals 
Involved 4 matches and 8 clubs

Round 3 – semifinals 
Involved 2 matches and 4 clubs

Final

Teams and scorers 

Scoring - Try = three (3) points - Goal = two (2) points - Drop goal = two (2) points

The road to success

Notes and comments 
1 * The first Yorkshire Cup game played at this ground, to which Bradford Northern moved for season 1908-09
2 * Belle Vue is the home ground of Wakefield Trinity with a capacity of approximately 12,500. The record attendance was 37,906 on the 21 March 1936 in the Challenge Cup semi-final between Leeds and Huddersfield

General information for those unfamiliar 
The Rugby League Yorkshire Cup competition was a knock-out competition between (mainly professional) rugby league clubs from  the  county of Yorkshire. The actual area was at times increased to encompass other teams from  outside the  county such as Newcastle, Mansfield, Coventry, and even London (in the form of Acton & Willesden.

The Rugby League season always (until the onset of "Summer Rugby" in 1996) ran from around August-time through to around May-time and this competition always took place early in the season, in the Autumn, with the final taking place in (or just before) December (The only exception to this was when disruption of the fixture list was caused during, and immediately after, the two World Wars)

See also 
1911–12 Northern Rugby Football Union season
Rugby league county cups

References

External links
Saints Heritage Society
1896–97 Northern Rugby Football Union season at wigan.rlfans.com
Hull&Proud Fixtures & Results 1896/1897
Widnes Vikings - One team, one passion Season In Review - 1896-97
The Northern Union at warringtonwolves.org

RFL Yorkshire Cup
Yorkshire Cup